The House at 15 Davis Avenue in Newton, Massachusetts, is a well-preserved modest Italianate house.  It is a -story wood-frame structure, whose features include paired brackets in the eaves, bracketed lintels above the doors and windows, and paneled corner pilaster strips.  The main entrance is flanked by sidelight windows and topped by a transom.  Likely built in the 1850s, this was probably one of the first houses built when Seth Davis (whose house stands on Eden Avenue) began to sell off some of his landholdings.

The house was listed on the National Register of Historic Places in 1986.

See also
 House at 3 Davis Avenue
 National Register of Historic Places listings in Newton, Massachusetts

References

Houses on the National Register of Historic Places in Newton, Massachusetts
Italianate architecture in Massachusetts
Houses completed in 1850